The 2018 Hlinka Gretzky Cup (branded as the 2018 Hlinka Gretzky Cup presented by Ram for sponsorship reasons) was an under-18 international ice hockey tournament held in Edmonton and Red Deer, Alberta, Canada from August 6–11, 2018 at Rogers Place in Edmonton and Servus Arena in Red Deer.

Preliminary round
All times are Mountain Daylight Time (UTC-6).

Group A

Group B

Final round

Seventh place game

Fifth place game

Semifinals

Canada's game-tying goal was considered controversial, as video footage suggested that the goal had been scored after time officially expired. However, as the tournament did not officially use video review, referees allowed the goal to stand.

Bronze medal game

Final

Final standings

References 

Hlinka Gretzky Cup
2018
International ice hockey competitions hosted by Canada
Hlinka
Hlinka Gretzky Cup
Hlinka Gretzky Cup